Dudley North (23 August 1684 – 1730) of Glemham Hall, Little Glemham, Suffolk was a British landowner and Tory politician who sat in the House of Commons from 1710 to 1730.
North was the eldest and only surviving son of   Sir Dudley North of Camden Place, Maiden Lane, London and his wife Anne Cann, daughter of Sir Robert Cann, 1st Baronet of Compton Greenfield, Gloucestershire. A member of the House of North, he was a grandson of Anne Montagu of Boughton House of the House of Montagu. His father was well known as a merchant, economist, and Tory politician and had purchased the Glemham estate shortly before his death in 1691.  North was educated privately at Kensington, with ‘Mr Agier’; and was admitted at St. John’s College, Cambridge on 12 May 1701. Some time before 1708, he married, with £20,000, Katherine Yale (died 1715), daughter of Elihu Yale of Plas Grono, near Wrexham. Yale gave his name to Yale University.

North stood for Parliament  at Thetford at the 1708 British general election with Sir Thomas Hanmer, 4th Baronet to whom he was related, but was unsuccessful. He became a common councilman for Dunwich in 1710.  At the 1710 British general election, he was returned unopposed as Tory Member of Parliament. He was classified as one of the ‘worthy patriots’ who  brought to light the mismanagements of the previous ministry. In  March 1711 he was appointed to a drafting committee for a private bill on Great Yarmouth harbour, and was  also chosen  to draft a bill to curb wool smuggling. He became an alderman of Dunwich in 1712 and was bailiff for the year 1713 to 1714. He was returned for Thetford again at the 1713 British general election again with Hanmer’s support.

North  was returned for Thetford again  in 1715 and from then on voted consistently against the Government. At the  1722 British general election, he transferred to Orford and was returned on the Price Devereux interest He was elected for Orford again in 1727.

Children

Dudley North  died on 4 February 1730. He had two sons, and three daughters of whom one son and one daughter predeceased him. His daughter Anne North Yale married Nicholas Herbert, son of Thomas Herbert, 8th Earl of Pembroke of Wilton House and Margaret Sawyer of Highclere Castle. It was her father, Sir Robert Sawyer who built and owned Highclere Castle. At his death, the castle and estates went to Thomas and Margaret, until her death. It then passed to Nicholas's brother, Robert Sawyer Herbert (died 1769). One of Dudley's son, William Dudley North Yale, also married into the Herbert family, this time to Lady Barbara Herbert, daughter of Thomas Herbert, 8th Earl of Pembroke and his second wife, Barbara Herbert, Countess of Pembroke. The children were all raised at Highclere Castle by Reverend Isaac Milles.

References

1684 births
1730 deaths
Members of the Parliament of Great Britain for English constituencies
British MPs 1710–1713
British MPs 1713–1715
British MPs 1715–1722
British MPs 1722–1727
British MPs 1727–1734